Ânderson Miguel da Silva (born 28 July 1983), known as Nenê, is a Brazilian footballer who plays for Portuguese club U.D. Vilafranquense as a striker.

After being crowned the Portuguese Primeira Liga's top scorer in 2009, he went on to spend most of his professional career in Italy, representing several clubs.

Club career
Born in São Paulo, Nenê began his career with modest Brazilian clubs, also having a spell at Cruzeiro Esporte Clube, then moved abroad to Portugal's C.D. Nacional in July 2008. In his first and only season in Primeira Liga he turned in stellar performances, leading the goalscoring charts with 20 goals (22 overall) by notably netting in home fixtures against Sporting CP (1–1) and S.L. Benfica (3–1 win), while also helping the Madeira team reach the semi-finals of the Portuguese Cup and qualify for the UEFA Europa League.

In June 2009, Nenê joined Italy's Cagliari Calcio on a four-year contract for about €4.5 million, with the player reported to be earning approximately €450,000 per season. He spent his debut campaign in the Serie A alternating between the starting XI and the substitutes bench, but still scored eight goals – second-best in the squad – as the Sardinia club narrowly avoided relegation.

Nenê scored a hat-trick in a 3–0 home win against Calcio Catania on 12 December 2010. In July 2013, aged 30, he renewed his contract for another year.

On 25 July 2014, after five seasons and an average of less than five league goals, free agent Nenê signed for fellow league side Hellas Verona FC. Late into the following January transfer window he was loaned to Spezia Calcio of Serie B, with the move being made permanent in the summer. He remained at the Stadio Alberto Picco until July 2017, when he joined A.S. Bari in the same division.

Nenê returned to Portugal's top flight on 8 August 2018 after eight years away, agreeing to a one-year deal at Moreirense F.C. with the option of a further campaign. The following March, this clause was activated.

Honours

Individual
Primeira Liga top scorer: 2008–09

References

External links

1983 births
Living people
Brazilian footballers
Footballers from São Paulo
Association football forwards
Campeonato Brasileiro Série A players
Esporte Clube São Bento players
Santa Cruz Futebol Clube players
América Futebol Clube (SP) players
Cruzeiro Esporte Clube players
Ipatinga Futebol Clube players
Primeira Liga players
Liga Portugal 2 players
C.D. Nacional players
Moreirense F.C. players
Leixões S.C. players
U.D. Vilafranquense players
Serie A players
Serie B players
Cagliari Calcio players
Hellas Verona F.C. players
Spezia Calcio players
S.S.C. Bari players
Brazilian expatriate footballers
Expatriate footballers in Portugal
Expatriate footballers in Italy
Brazilian expatriate sportspeople in Portugal
Brazilian expatriate sportspeople in Italy